Mohammed Jasem M. Al-Qaree (born 11 May 1988) is a Saudi Arabian athlete competing in the combined events. He won multiple medals at regional level. He currently holds national records in the decathlon and indoor heptathlon.

International competitions

Personal bests

Outdoors
100 metres – 10.61 (Qatif 2015)
400 metres – 49.36 (Manama 2015)
1500 metres – 5:28.42 (Manama 2015)
110 metres hurdles – 14.51 (Qatif 2015)
400 metres hurdles – 52.42 (Makkah 2009)
High jump – 2.00 (Guangzhou 2010)
Pole vault – 4.50 (Riyadh 2013)
Long jump – 7.42 (0.0 m/s, Makkah 2011)
Shot put – 12.97 (Manama 2015)
Discus throw – 37.01 (Manama 2015)
Javelin throw – 54.11 (Manama 2015)
Decathlon – 7642 (Damascus 2009)

Indoors
60 metres – 6.84 (Hanoi 2009)
1000 metres – 2:52.04 (Hanoi 2009)
60 metres hurdles – 8.08 (Doha 2016)
High jump – 2.06 (Hanoi 2009)
Pole vault – 4.40 (Hanoi 2009)
Long jump – 7.35 (Hanoi 2009)
Shot put – 13.32 (Doha 2016)
Heptathlon – 5791 (Hanoi 2009)

References

1988 births
Living people
Saudi Arabian decathletes
Athletes (track and field) at the 2010 Asian Games
Athletes (track and field) at the 2018 Asian Games
Asian Games competitors for Saudi Arabia
21st-century Saudi Arabian people
20th-century Saudi Arabian people